Johanna Katriina Manninen (born 4 April 1980) is a Finnish former athlete specializing in sprinting events. She won two gold medals at the 2007 Summer Universiade, in addition to several medals in younger age categories.

Biography
She competed at 3 Olympic Games, 1996 Summer Olympics, 2000 Summer Olympics and 2004 Summer Olympics.

Achievements

Personal bests
Outdoor
100 metres – 11.27 (+1.2 m/s) (Vaasa 2007)
200 metres – 22.93 (-0.7 m/s) (Edmonton 2001)
400 metres – 54.86 (Bratislava 2002)

Indoor
50 metres – 6.32 (Liévin 2003)
60 metres – 7.22 (Stuttgart 2003)
200 metres – 23.28 (Liévin	2003)

References

1980 births
Living people
Finnish female sprinters
Athletes (track and field) at the 1996 Summer Olympics
Athletes (track and field) at the 2000 Summer Olympics
Athletes (track and field) at the 2004 Summer Olympics
Olympic athletes of Finland
Universiade medalists in athletics (track and field)
People from Seinäjoki
Universiade gold medalists for Finland
Medalists at the 2007 Summer Universiade
Olympic female sprinters
Sportspeople from South Ostrobothnia